The 2017–18 Pepperdine Waves women's basketball team represents Pepperdine University in the 2017–18 NCAA Division I women's basketball season. The Waves, as members of the West Coast Conference, were led by first year head coach DeLisha Milton-Jones. The Waves play their home games at the Firestone Fieldhouse on the university campus in Malibu, California. They finished the season 10–20, 5–13 in WCC play to finish in a tie for eighth place. They advanced to the quarterfinals of the WCC women's tournament where they lost to Gonzaga.

Previous season
They finished the season 7–23, 5–13 in WCC play to finish in a tie for eighth place. They lost in the first round of the WCC women's tournament to Pacific.

Roster

Schedule

|-
!colspan=9 style=| Non-conference regular season

|-
!colspan=9 style=| WCC regular season

|-
!colspan=9 style=| WCC Women's Tournament

See also
 2017–18 Pepperdine Waves men's basketball team

References

Pepperdine
Pepperdine Waves women's basketball seasons
Pepperdine
Pepperdine